Luther G. (Lute) Jerstad (1936 – 31 October 1998) was an American mountaineer and mountain guide who was a member of the 1963 American Mount Everest Expedition.  He reached the summit of Mount Everest by the South Col route on May 22, 1963 with Barry Bishop. Three weeks earlier, on May 1, Jim Whittaker and Indian mountaineer Nawang Gombu, who was of Sherpa origin, had reached the summit, placing an American flag there.  Jerstad described seeing the flag as he and Bishop approached the summit, "Just then we came over the last rise and there was that American flag -- and what a fantastic sight!  That great big flag whipping in the breeze, and the ends were tattered."

Later that day, they met up with fellow expedition members Tom Hornbein and Willi Unsoeld, who had just completed the first ascent of Everest by the West Ridge route, and the first traverse of the mountain.  The four climbers made a frigid high-altitude bivouac at 28,000 feet without tents, sleeping bags or supplemental oxygen, and survived only because it was not a windy night.

He was raised in Minnesota, and his family moved to the Pacific Northwest when he was 13 years old.  He was a graduate of Pacific Lutheran University, where he was a varsity basketball player.  He earned a master's degree at Washington State University and a doctorate at the University of Oregon.  After a short career as a college professor, he started Lute Jerstad Adventures, a trekking, river rafting and mountaineering service.

Jerstad died of a heart attack on October 31, 1998, in Nepal on Kala Patthar, a peak that offers excellent views of Mount Everest. He was on a hike with his 12-year-old grandson to introduce the boy to Himalayan travel. He was cremated in Kathmandu and his ashes were buried at the Tengboche monastery.

In April 1976, Jerstad did a radio interview with famous San Francisco radio DJ Dr. Don Rose of 610 KFRC. The interview can be heard here.

References

See also
List of 20th-century summiters of Mount Everest

1936 births
1998 deaths
American mountain climbers
American summiters of Mount Everest